Ossahatchie Creek is a stream in the U.S. state of Georgia that runs through Harris and Talbot counties in the west central part of the state. It is a tributary to Mulberry Creek.

Name
Ossahatchie is a name derived from the Muscogee language meaning "Pokeweed Creek".

Many variant names have been recorded, including:
Osahatchee Creek
Osahatchi Creek
Osauhatchee Creek
Osawhatchee Creek
Osohatchee Creek
Osouhatchee Creek
Ossahatchee Creek
Ossohatchee Creek
Sawhatchee Creek
Sowachee Creek
Sowahachee Creek

Crossings

The following roads cross the creek:

Harris County:
U.S. Route 27 north of Cataula
Denney Rd northeast of Cataula
Harris Rd north of Ellerslie
U.S. Route 27 Alternate/Georgia State Route 85 between Ellerslie and Waverly Hall
Mount Airy Rd south of Waverly Hall
Ridgeway Rd south of Waverly Hall

References

Rivers of Georgia (U.S. state)
Rivers of Harris County, Georgia
Rivers of Talbot County, Georgia